Rehman Rashid (24 October 1955 – 3 June 2017) was a prominent Malaysian journalist and writer.

Personal life and career
Born in Taiping, Perak, Rehman studied in the Malay College Kuala Kangsar, before pursuing a degree in Marine Biology at University College Swansea in Wales. He was well known at University for writing folk songs and performing them at every opportunity.

Rehman became a journalist in 1981. Prior to this, he worked with the Fisheries Research Institute in Penang and as a research associate with the Faculty of Fisheries and Marine Science of Universiti Putra Malaysia.

After seven years as Leader Writer and columnist with the New Straits Times, Malaysia's leading English-language daily, he joined Asiaweek magazine in Hong Kong as a Senior Writer.  From there, he left for a year in Bermuda, as a Senior Writer with the Bermuda Business magazine, before returning home to Malaysia to complete the book A Malaysian Journey.

He was the Malaysian Press Institute's Journalist of the Year for 1985, and Bermuda's Print Journalist of the Year for 1991.

He suffered a heart attack in January 2017 and was hospitalized at the Selayang Hospital. On 3 June 2017 he died at age 62.

References

1955 births
2017 deaths
People from Perak
Malaysian journalists
Malaysian people of Indian descent
International Writing Program alumni